The Avery is a 57-story, 618 ft (188 m) residential skyscraper in the South of Market district of San Francisco, California. The tower site is bounded by Folsom Street on the south and Fremont Street on the east.

The building features 118 luxurious condominium residences starting on the 33rd floor and upwards, and premium luxury apartment rentals on floors 2-32 at Avery 450.

See also
 List of tallest buildings in San Francisco

References

Residential buildings completed in 2019
Residential skyscrapers in San Francisco
Residential condominiums in San Francisco
South of Market, San Francisco
2019 establishments in California
2019 in San Francisco